Gotovye is a rural locality (a selo) in Starooskolsky District, Belgorod Oblast, Russia. The population was 52 as of 2010. There are 3 streets.

Geography 
Gotovye is located 24 km southeast of Stary Oskol (the district's administrative centre) by road. Babaninka is the nearest rural locality.

References 

Rural localities in Starooskolsky District